Sonning Lock is a lock and associated weir situated on the River Thames at the village of Sonning near Reading, Berkshire, England. The first lock was built by the Thames Navigation Commission in 1773 and it has been rebuilt three times since then. There is a weir a little upstream at the top of the island where Sonning Backwater separates from the main course of the river.

History

A weir at Sonning is recorded as belonging to the Blunte family in the 15th century. This was associated with the mill and fisheries and mention is made of a "Locke-heise" at this time. The flash lock was replaced in 1773 by the pound lock. This was the highest upstream of the eight locks constructed after the navigation act of 1770. It was commissioned in 1771 but took two years to build. Fir wood was originally used for these locks, but this decayed very quickly and was replaced at Sonning by oak in 1787. Repairs took place in 1827 when the old flash lock was brought back temporarily into use. By this time a lock house had been built.

The lock-keeper from 1845 to 1878 was James Sadler, a poet and beekeeper.  He wrote verses about the river and about bees, and is credited with the invention of the Berkshire hive. One of his works The Thames from Oxford to Windsor is a rhymed list of the locks, bridges and towns.

The lock was rebuilt in 1868. The weirs were reconstructed in 1898 and further rebuilding of the lock occurred in 1905.

Access to the lock
The lock is a short walk upstream from Sonning Bridge, which itself is close to the centre of Sonning. It is also accessible via a short footpath between St Andrew's Church and the river. The path by the river continues into the town of Reading.

Reach above the lock

On the southern Berkshire bank, on the approach into Reading is the Thames Valley Park. Beyond the northern Oxfordshire bank are Caversham Lakes which include the Redgrave Pinsent Rowing Lake and the Thames & Kennet Marina. Access to these is on  the upper part of the reach, opposite the entrance to the River Kennet at Blake's Lock. There is a bend in the river before Herons Island, View Island and Caversham Lock. Sonning Regatta takes place at Sonning in May, while Reading Town Regatta and Thames Valley Park Regatta are held further upstream in June.

There are navigation transit markers just downstream of the entrance to the Thames & Kennet Marina, to allow river users to check their speed.

Thames Path
The Thames Path stays on the southern bank all the way to Caversham Lock, crossing the River Kennet on Horseshoe Bridge, which is attached to Brunel's Great Western Railway Bridge.

Literature and the media

See also

 Locks on the River Thames
 Rowing on the River Thames
 Sonning Bishop's Palace, nearby

References

1773 establishments in England
Locks of Berkshire
Locks on the River Thames
Weirs on the River Thames
Lock